Holy Cross School is a convent school in Ballia, Uttar Pradesh, India. It is affiliated with the Council for the Indian School Certificate Examinations for high school and the Indian School Certificate for intermediate school. The students are called as Crossians.

References

External links
Holy Cross School, Amrithpalli, Ballia, Uttar Pradesh at Schoolsindia
School website

Catholic secondary schools in India
High schools and secondary schools in Uttar Pradesh
Private schools in Uttar Pradesh
Christian schools in Uttar Pradesh
Ballia
Educational institutions in India with year of establishment missing